Fatty at San Diego is a 1913 American short comedy film featuring Fatty Arbuckle and Mabel Normand.

Cast
 Roscoe 'Fatty' Arbuckle - Fatty
 Mabel Normand - Mabel
 Phyllis Allen
 Minta Durfee
 Henry Lehrman
 Ford Sterling

See also
 Fatty Arbuckle filmography

References

External links

1913 films
Silent American comedy films
1913 comedy films
1913 short films
American silent short films
American black-and-white films
Films directed by George Nichols
American comedy short films
Films set in San Diego
Films shot in San Diego
1910s American films
1910s English-language films